Theo van Doesburg (30 August 1883 – 7 March 1931) was a Dutch artist, who practiced painting, writing, poetry and architecture. He is best known as the founder and leader of De Stijl. He was married to artist, pianist and choreographer Nelly van Doesburg.

Early life 
Theo van Doesburg was born Christian Emil Marie Küpper on 30 August 1883, in Utrecht, Netherlands, as the son of the photographer  and Henrietta Catherina Margadant. After a short period of training in acting and singing, he decided to become a storekeeper. He always regarded his stepfather, Theodorus Doesburg, to be his natural father, so that his first works are signed with Theo Doesburg, to which he later added "van".

Career 

His first exhibition was in 1908. From 1912 onwards, he supported his works by writing for magazines. He considered himself to be a modern painter, at that time, although his early work is in line with the Amsterdam Impressionists and is influenced by Vincent van Gogh, both in style and subject matter. This suddenly changed in 1913 after reading Wassily Kandinsky's Rückblicke, in which he looks back at his life as a painter from 1903 to 1913. It made him realize there was a higher, more spiritual level in painting that originates from the mind rather than from everyday life, and that abstraction is the only logical outcome of this. It was already in 1912 that Van Doesburg was criticizing Futurism in an art article in Eenheid no. 127, on 9 November 1912, because "The mimetic expression of velocity (whatever its form may be: the aeroplane, the automobile, and so on) is diametrically opposed to the character of painting, the supreme origin of which is to be found in inner life". On 6 November 1915, he wrote in the same journal: "Mondrian realizes the importance of line. The line has almost become a work of art in itself; one can not play with it when the representation of objects perceived was all-important. The white canvas is almost solemn. Each superfluous line, each wrongly placed line, any color placed without veneration or care, can spoil everything—that is, the spiritual".

The De Stijl movement 

It was while reviewing an exhibition for one of these magazines he wrote for, in 1915 (halfway through his two-year service in the army), that he came in contact with the works of Piet Mondrian, who was eight years older than he was, and had by then already gained some attention with his paintings. Van Doesburg saw in these paintings his ideal in painting: a complete abstraction of reality. Soon after the exhibition Van Doesburg got in contact with Mondrian, and together with related artists Bart van der Leck, Vilmos Huszár and Jacobus Oud they founded the magazine De Stijl in 1917.

Promoting De Stijl 

Although De Stijl was made up of many members, Van Doesburg was the "ambassador" of the movement, promoting it across Europe. He moved to Weimar in 1922, deciding to make an impression on the Bauhaus principal, Walter Gropius, to spread the influence of the movement.

While Gropius accepted many of the precepts of contemporary art movements he did not feel that Doesburg should become a Bauhaus master. Doesburg then installed himself near to the Bauhaus buildings and started to attract school students interested in the new ideas of Constructivism, Dadaism, and De Stijl.

The split with Mondrian 

The friendship between Van Doesburg and Mondrian remained strong in these years, although their primary means of communication was by letter. In 1923 Van Doesburg moved to Paris, together with his later wife Nelly van Moorsel. Because the two men got to see each other on a much more regular basis the differences in character became apparent: Mondrian was an introvert, while van Doesburg was more flamboyant and extravagant. During 1924 the two men had disagreements, which eventually led to a temporary split that year. The exact reason for the split has been a point of contention among art historians; usually the divergent ideas about the directions of the lines in the paintings have been named as the primary reason: Mondrian never accepted diagonals, whereas Doesburg insisted on the dynamic aspects of the diagonal, and indeed featured it in his art. Mondrian accepted some concepts of diagonals, such as in his "Lozenge" paintings, where the canvas was rotated 45 degrees, while still maintaining horizontal lines. In recent years, however, this theory has been challenged by art historians such as  Carel Blotkamp, who cites the artist's different concepts about space and time. After the split, Van Doesburg launched a new concept for his art, Elementarism, which was characterized by the diagonal lines and which rivaled Mondrian's Neo-Plasticism.

In 1929 the two men reconciled when they accidentally met in a café in Paris.

Architecture, design, and typography 

Van Doesburg had other activities apart from painting and promoting De Stijl: he made efforts in architecture, designing houses for artists, together with Sophie Taeuber-Arp and Hans Arp he designed the decoration for the Aubette entertainment complex in Strasbourg. Together with El Lissitzky and Kurt Schwitters, Van Doesburg pioneered the efforts to an International of Arts in two congresses held in Düsseldorf and Weimar, in 1922. A geometrically constructed alphabet Van Doesburg designed in 1919 has been revived in digital form as Architype Van Doesburg. This typeface anticipates similar later experimentation by Kurt Schwitters in his typeface Architype Schwitters. In the mid 1920s, Van Doesburg worked together with Schwitters and the artist Kate Steinitz to produce a series of children's fairy-tale books that featured unusual typography, including Hahnepeter (Peter the Rooster, 1924), Die Märchen vom Paradies (The Fairy Tales of Paradise, 1924–25), and Die Scheuche (The Scarecrow, 1925).

Van Doesburg also kept a link with Dada, publishing the magazine Mécano under the heteronym of I. K. Bonset (possibly derived from "Ik ben zot", Dutch for "I am foolish"). He also published Dada poetry under the same name in De Stijl. Under a second pseudonym, Aldo Camini, he published anti-philosophical prose, inspired by the Italian representative of Metaphysical art, Carlo Carrà. In these works of literature, he heavily opposed individualism (and thus against the movement of the Tachtigers, realism, and psychological thinking). He sought for a collective experience of reality. His conception of intensity had much in common with Paul van Ostaijen's conception of dynamiek. He wanted to strip words of their former meaning, and give them a new meaning and power of expression. By doing this, he tried to evoke a new reality, instead of describing it.

Last years 
Van Doesburg stayed active in art groups and the magazine Cercle et Carré, which he left in 1929. "The plan to produce a magazine had been broached some time before. It is clear from the correspondence that in the spring of 1928 Van Doesburg made the first designs for the layout of the periodical. He wrote to Joaquín Torres-García on May 28, 1929 : I will prepare the blueprint fo nouveau plan." Art Concret, which he co-founded in 1929, and Abstraction-Création, which he co-founded in 1931. At the end of February 1931 he was forced to move to Davos in Switzerland because of his declining health. Van Doesburg did not recuperate: on 7 March 1931, he died of a heart attack. After his death Nelly van Doesburg released the last issue of De Stijl as a memorial issue with contributions by old and new members from De Stijl.

Influence 
Van Doesburg's work has had significant influence, including that dealing with issues of crossover art, design and architecture. For example, his Space-time construction #3 (1923) was a key work in the Miller Company Collection of Abstract Art's Painting toward architecture exhibition (1947–52, 28 venues). From that time, the work was influential to the practice of noted architect Harry Seidler. In 1992, he acquired the artwork, which was donated to the National Gallery of Australia in Canberra in 2010. In a travelling, international exhibition on Seidler's work, Van Doesburg's Space time-construction #3 was shown as a key influence.

Works and publications

Publications 
 Baljeu, Joost (1974). Theo van Doesburg. London: Studio Vista. .
 Hoek, Els; Blokhuis, Marleen; Goovaerts, Ingrid; Kamphuys, Natalie; et al. (2000). Theo van Doesburg: Oeuvre Catalogus. Utrecht: Centraal Museum. .
 Overy, Paul (1969). De Stijl. Studio Vista. .
 White, Michael (2003). De Stijl and Dutch modernism. Manchester University Press. .

Works

See also 
 De Stijl

References

External links 

 Scans of the De Stijl issue with Van Doesburg's Letterklankbeelden
 Collection Rijksmuseum
 Theo van Doesburg Archive: 'Archive of Theo van Doesburg and his wives' 
 Several original writings and articles by Theo van Doesburg
 Many sourced quotes of Theo van Doesburg in: De Stijl 1917–1931 – The Dutch Contribution to Modern Art, by H.L.C. Jaffé; J.M. Meulenhoff, Amsterdam 1956
 Biography facts of Theo van Doesburg, in the Dutch R.K.D. Archive, the Hague
 

De Stijl
1883 births
1931 deaths
Abstract painters
Modern painters
Artists from Utrecht
Dutch male painters
20th-century Dutch architects
20th-century Dutch painters
20th-century Dutch male artists